FuelPHP is an open-source web application framework written in PHP which implements the HMVC pattern.

History
The FuelPHP project commenced in October 2010, with its major contributors being Harro Verton, Jelmer Schreuder, Dan Horrigan, Philip Sturgeon and Frank de Jonge. In November 2013, Steve West joined the development team.

Philip Sturgeon and Dan Horrigan had contributed to the CodeIgniter framework.

The first version of FuelPHP (FuelPHP 1.0) was developed under the GitHub repository named Fuel. Another GitHub repository named FuelPHP was created for the development of the second version (FuelPHP 2.0).

Major releases

Project guidelines
The project guidelines are:
 Building a framework based on the best ideas from other frameworks.
 The framework must provide powerful functionalities, it must be easy to work with and it should have a lightweight codebase.
 Taking account of community developers' orientations.

Architecture overview
 FuelPHP is written in PHP 5.3 and requires at least 5.3.3 for V1.x.
 Cascading File System (inspired by Kohana framework): a directory structure partially based on namespaces used by classes.
 Flexibility: almost every component of the core framework can be extended or replaced.
 Modularity: applications can be divided up into modules.
 Extensibility: additional functionalities can be added to the framework through packages.

Features overview
 A URL routing system
 RESTful implementation
 HMVC implementation
 Template parsing: Stags (a specific FuelPHP template engine) and Mustache template engines are included; drivers for Markdown, Smarty, Twig, Haml, Jade and Dwoo template engines
 Form and data validation features
 An Object Relational Mapper (ORM)
 Vulnerability protections: the framework encodes output, provides CSRF protection, cross-site scripting protection, input filtering features, and prevents SQL injection

 The Auth package provides a set of components with which authentication and authorization application functionalities can be built. Sentry is another authentication and authorisation package for FuelPHP.
 A caching system

Tools
 Profiling and debugging: PHP Quick Profiler integration
 Database migrations tool (inspired by the popular Ruby on Rails framework)
 Scaffolding (inspired by Ruby on Rails framework, Oil package)
 Tasks (operations that can be executed through the command line)
 Testing: PHPUnit integration (Oil package)

Roadmap
For the new version (V2) currently under development, some very significant changes are planned:

 It will be fully installable using Composer
 It will require PHP 5.4+
 The framework core will be split up in different Composer packages, most framework independent
 Fuel applications will be independent packages as well, Composer installable
 The framework will support multiple applications in a single installation
 "Oil" will become a separate application, with command line, terminal and HTML support
 "Oil" will contain a generic admin backend for your applications
 Complete platform independent DBAL, including a schema manager
 Completely unit tested, with 100% code coverage
 Fully object oriented, no static code in the core anymore

Some of the features of the V1 release will be made available as separate V2 packages, for others a compatibility package will be created. It will minimise the impact when an existing application has to be migrated.

References

External links

FuelPHP Documentation
FuelPHP Blog
FuelPHP Forum
FuelPHP V1 source code
FuelPHP V2 source code

PHP software
PHP frameworks
Web frameworks
Software using the MIT license
Free software programmed in PHP